Albert R. Day (December 1861 -?) was an American educator and politician from Maine. Day, a Republican from Corinna, Penobscot County was Maine Senate President.

Day was a high school teacher and principal, eventually becoming Superintendent of Schools in Corinna. He left that profession in 1887, and in 1893 was elected to the Maine House of Representatives. In 1895, he was elected to the Maine Senate, and was re-elected in 1897, also becoming President of the Maine Senate that year.

References

1861 births
Year of death missing
People from Corinna, Maine
Republican Party members of the Maine House of Representatives
Presidents of the Maine Senate
Republican Party Maine state senators
American school principals
School superintendents in Maine
19th-century American educators
19th-century American politicians